Basketball at the Pan American Games began at the inaugural edition in Buenos Aires, Argentina for men only. The women competition began at the 1959 edition in Chicago, United States, and was not held in 1995 edition in Mar del Plata.

Men's tournament

Medal table

Participation details

Women's tournament

Medal table

Participation details

3x3 basketball

Men's tournament

Women's tournament

Medal table

External links
 Brazil's History of Men's Tournament
 Brazil's History of Women's Tournament
 Caribbean Basketball Confederation...Since 1981

 
Sports at the Pan American Games
Pan American Games
Basketball competitions in the Americas between national teams